Ardıçkaya (formerly Nadire) is a village in Ermenek district of Karaman Province, Turkey. The population of the town is around 1700  as of 2010. The name of the town  refers to junipers around the village (Ardıçkaya means "juniper rock"). The old name of the village is Nadire.

References

Villages in Ermenek District